Viscount Monckton of Brenchley, of Brenchley in the County of Kent, is a hereditary title in the Peerage of the United Kingdom. It was created on 11 February 1957 for the lawyer, Conservative politician and former Minister of Defence, Sir Walter Monckton. His son, the second viscount, was a major-general in the British Army.  the title is held by the latter's eldest son, the third viscount, who succeeded in 2006. He is a journalist known for his position that: "Climate science should be less political, while climate policies should be more scientific. Scientists should openly address uncertainties and exaggerations in their predictions of global warming, while politicians should dispassionately count the real costs as well as the imagined benefits of their policy measures"<world climate declaration June 27, 2022ef></ref> and for his work for The Heartland Institute and as the creator of the Eternity puzzle.

Viscounts Monckton of Brenchley (1957)
Walter Turner Monckton, 1st Viscount Monckton of Brenchley (1891–1965)
Gilbert Walter Riversdale Monckton, 2nd Viscount Monckton of Brenchley (1915–2006)
Christopher Walter Monckton, 3rd Viscount Monckton of Brenchley (b. 1952)

The heir presumptive is the present holder's brother the Hon. Timothy David Robert Monckton (b. 1955).
The heir presumptive's heir apparent is his son Dominic Walter Monckton (b. 1985).

Notes

References
Kidd, Charles, Williamson, David (editors), Debrett's Peerage and Baronetage (1990 edition). New York: St Martin's Press, 1990, 

Viscountcies in the Peerage of the United Kingdom
Noble titles created in 1957
Noble titles created for UK MPs
People from Brenchley